Robert Ravendale (died 19 April 1404) was a Canon of Windsor from 1399 to 1404.

Career

He was appointed:
Rector of Thenford, Northamptonshire
Rector of Littlebury, Essex
Rector of St Martin, Ludgate
Rector of Byfield, Northamptonshire

He was appointed to the fourth stall in St George's Chapel, Windsor Castle in 1399, and held the stall until 1404.

Notes 

Year of birth missing
1404 deaths
Canons of Windsor